Willem Hendrik Wilhelmus van Royen (1672 – 1742) was a Dutch Golden Age painter from the Northern Netherlands.

Royen was born in Amsterdam, where it is unknown from whom he learned to paint, but based on stylistic analysis he has been determined to be a follower of Melchior d'Hondecoeter. His works have been confused in the past with those of Willem Frederiksz van Royen, a Dutch Golden Age painter active in Berlin.

Royen died in Amsterdam.

References

External links

1672 births
1742 deaths
Painters from Amsterdam
Dutch Golden Age painters
Dutch male painters